Mercury FM was a radio station in Crawley and Horsham.

Mercury FM may also refer to:

 Heart Hertfordshire
 KMFM Medway
 KMFM West Kent